Northbourne may refer to:

 Northbourne, Bournemouth, Dorset, England
 Northbourne, Kent, England
 Northbourne, a village formerly part of East Hagbourne, now Didcot, England
 Northbourne Avenue, a road in Canberra, Australia
 Baron Northbourne, a title in the Peerage of the United Kingdom

See also 
 Bourne (disambiguation)